The Advanced Maryland Automatic Network Disk Archiver (Amanda) is an open source computer archiving tool that is able to back up data residing on multiple computers on a network. It uses a client–server model, where the server contacts each client to perform a backup at a scheduled time.

Amanda was initially developed at the University of Maryland and is released under a BSD-style license. Amanda is available both as a free community edition and fully supported enterprise edition. Amanda runs on almost any Unix or Unix-like systems. Amanda supports Windows systems using Samba or a native Win32 client with support for open files.

Amanda supports both tape-based and disk-based backup, and provides some useful functionality not available in other backup products.  Amanda supports tape-spanning i.e. if a backup set does not fit in one tape, it will be split into multiple tapes.

Major releases
The most recent stable release is version 3.5.1, which was released on December 1, 2017.

Enterprise edition
A commercial version of Amanda was developed by the company Zmanda. It includes a management graphical user interface (GUI) and other features such as scheduler, plugin framework, and an optional cloud backup service support. The cloud backup option uses the Amazon S3 service from Amazon Web Services as the cloud storage provider and enables safe offsite storage of the Amanda backup data. The plugin framework allows for application-specific backups and is used by Amanda Enterprise to support applications such as Oracle database, Samba network share, NDMP, etc. Amanda Enterprise also supports image-level backup of live virtual machine running on VMware infrastructure.

See also
 Bacula
 Proxmox Backup Server

References

External links

 

Free backup software
Storage software
University of Maryland, College Park research projects